Hatod is a town and a nagar panchayat in Indore district in the Indian state of Madhya Pradesh.

Geography
It has an average elevation of 559 metres (1,833 feet).

Demographics
 India census, Hatod had a population of 9,030. Males constitute 51% of the population and females 49%. Hatod has an average literacy rate of 54%, lower than the national average of 59.5%: male literacy is 67%, and female literacy is 39%. In Hatod, 16% of the population is under 6 years of age.

References

Cities and towns in Indore district